Aatmiyulu is a 1969 Indian Telugu-language drama film, produced by D. Madhusudhana Rao under the Saradhi Studios banner and directed by V. Madhusudhana Rao. It stars Akkineni Nageswara Rao and Vanisree, with music composed by S. Rajeswara Rao. The film was remade in Tamil as Pennin Vaazhkai (1981).

Plot
The film begins in a village where Veerayya a trustworthy servant, sacrifices his life while guarding his owner Jagannadham, a rich landlord against harm. Now Jagannadham makes arrangements for the maintenance of Veerayya's family and leaves to the city on the advice of his elder brother Barrister Raja Rao. Veerayya has a son Suryam, daughter Seetha and their mother also died giving birth to a baby girl. Here Veerayya's sly sister Mahankaali sell the baby to a childless couple Chidambaram and Nancharamma and they rear her by the name Saroja. Mahankaali also snatches the amount given by Jagannadham, educates her son Chittibabu and treats Suryam & Seeta as slaves. Anguished Suryam & Seeta reach the city and start working in a hotel. Years roll by, Suryam, by hard work studies, becomes a meritorious student, tops the university and also takes care of Seeta. At present, Jagannatham is a rich businessman his son Chandram is a dullard who goes into clutches of a vicious person Sadanandam. Even Mahankaali's son Chittibabu and Saroja split-up sister of Suryam are his friends. Saroja always conceits herself to live an elite lifestyle by marrying a wealthy man. Chittibabu deeply loves her, so, poses himself as a rich person and extravagant the money earned by his mother. Meanwhile, Jagannadham recognizes Suryam & Seetha and shifts them to his house where Jaya, the daughter of Raja Rao loves Suryam.

Having been impressed to Seeta's noble and humble character Jagannadham decides to perform her marriage with Chandram. On the other side, Chandram reveals the real face of Chittibabu and turns Saroja's love towards him. But Jagannadham forcibly performs his marriage with Seeta which Raja Rao dislikes and also opposes the love of Suryam & Jaya. Right now, Suryam leaves to Police training and Seeta becomes pregnant. Parallelly, Sadanandam has an evil eye on Saroja creates notoriety against her in society. At that time, unfortunately, Seeta goes into miscarriage when Saroja,  working as a nurse arrives to serve her. There, Chandram explains the circumstances to marry Seeta. Listening to it, distressed Seeta blames Saroja when she also loses her job. Annoyed Chandram decides to marry Saroja for which Seeta also agrees. By the time, Suryam returns as a Police officer, learns the rift and moves to caution Saroja. At that point in time, he realizes her as his own sister. Knowing it, Saroja jubilates but rejects to reveal her identity. Now Suryam wants to perform Saroja's marriage with Chittibabu to which Mahankaali disagrees. Moreover, Sadanandam and Chandram builds many obstructions which leads various controversies and misunderstandings but Suryam gamely faces it. At last, the entire truth comes forward even Raja Rao appreciates Suryam's honesty. Finally, the movie ends on a happy note with the marriages of Suryam and Jaya and Chittibabu and Saroja.

Cast

Soundtrack

Music composed by S. Rajeswara Rao.

Accolades
Nandi Award for Second Best Feature Film -  Silver won by D. Madhusudhana Rao under production of Saradhi Studios(1969)

References

External links
 

1969 films
1960s Telugu-language films
Indian drama films
Indian black-and-white films
Films directed by V. Madhusudhana Rao
Films scored by S. Rajeswara Rao
Films based on novels by Yaddanapudi Sulochana Rani
1969 drama films
Telugu films remade in other languages